Fatuma Issa Maonyo (born 9 April 1995) is a Tanzanian professional footballer who plays as a defender for Simba Queens and the Tanzania women's national team.

International career 
In July 2018, Maonyo won the 2018 CECAFA Women's Championship with Tanzania after defeating Ethiopia by 4–1 in their final match. She was also adjudged the best player of the tournament at the end.

Honours 

 CECAFA Women's Championship: 2018
 CECAFA Women's Championship Player of the Tournament: 2018

References

External links 
 Fatuma Issa Maonyo receiving 2018 CECAFA Best player award

1995 births
Living people
Tanzanian women's footballers
Women's association football defenders
Tanzania women's international footballers